The Kunga Group is a geologic group in British Columbia. It preserves fossils dating back to the Triassic period.

See also

 List of fossiliferous stratigraphic units in British Columbia

References
 

Triassic British Columbia
Oil shale in Canada
Oil shale formations